The Capture of Eaucourt l'Abbaye (1–3 October 1916) was a tactical incident during the Battle of the Somme. Eaucourt l'Abbaye (Eaucourt) is north-west of Martinpuich, south-east of Le Sars, south of the Butte de Warlencourt west of Gueudecourt and north-west of Flers. Eaucourt was a group of farm buildings in an enclosure built on the site of an Augustinian abbey, on a side road from Le Sars off the main Albert–Bapaume highway. Destremont Farm to the south-west of Le Sars and a derelict quarry south of Eaucourt had been fortified by the Germans.

Military operations began in the area in September 1914 during the Race to the Sea, when the divisions of the II Bavarian Corps advanced westwards on the north bank of the Somme, towards Albert and Amiens. Eaucourt l'Abbaye became a backwater until 1916, when the British and French began the Battle of the Somme . During the Battle of Flers–Courcelette  divisions of the British III Corps in the Fourth Army advanced close to Eaucourt and operations to capture it began on 1 October. A regiment of the 6th Bavarian Reserve Division in Eaucourt was overrun by a brigade of the 47th (1/2nd London) Division on 1 October, during the Battle of Le Transloy 

Operations continued until 3 October. After Eaucourt was captured, British attacks continued in the area, to take the Butte de Warlencourt, which was captured several times and lost to German counter-attacks, during the rest of the Battle of Le Transloy. In the winter of 1916–1917, which was the worst for fifty years, the area was considered by the troops of the I Anzac Corps to be the foulest sector of the Somme front. Eaucourt was lost on 24 March 1918 during the retreat of the 2nd Division and recaptured for the last time on 26 August, by the 21st Division.

Background

1914

On 25 September, during the Race to the Sea a French attack north of the Somme against the II Bavarian Corps (General Karl Ritter von Martini), forced a hurried withdrawal. As more Bavarian units arrived in the north, the 3rd Bavarian Division advanced along the north bank of the Somme, through Bouchavesnes, Leforest and Hardecourt until held up at Maricourt. The 4th Bavarian Division further to the north, defeated French Territorial divisions and then attacked westwards in the vicinity of Gueudecourt, towards Albert, through Sailly, Combles, Guillemont and Montauban, leaving a flank guard on the northern flank facing Eaucourt. The II Bavarian Corps and XIV Reserve Corps  Hermann von Stein) pushed back a French Territorial division from the area around Bapaume and advanced towards Bray-sur-Somme and Albert, as part of an offensive down the Somme valley to reach the sea. The German offensive was confronted north of the Somme by the northern corps of the French Second Army east of Albert. The XIV Reserve Corps attacked on 28 September, along the Roman road from Bapaume to Albert and Amiens, intending to reach the Ancre and then continue westwards along the Somme valley. The 28th Reserve Division advanced close to Fricourt against scattered resistance from French infantry and cavalry.

1916
Late on 20 July, when Eaucourt was  behind the front line, I Battalion, Infantry Regiment 62 of the 5th Division was billeted in the grounds and advanced from the area to counter-attack  (High Wood) the next morning. Next day, a Royal Flying Corps (RFC) reconnaissance aircraft of 3 Squadron saw a new German defence line from Le Transloy to Warlencourt, just in front of Eaucourt and that an extra line had been dug along the third line, from Eaucourt to Flers. On 15 September, the positions of the II Bavarian Corps around Martinpuich, Le Sars and Eaucourt were severely bombarded and artillery units in the area encountered British tanks for the first time, as British infantry advanced from Flers, supported by about thirty aircraft. By late September, the front line crossed the Albert–Bapaume road from the south-west to the north-east, through positions captured by III Corps during the Battle of Morval, when it provided a northern flank guard by attacking the maze of trenches west of Le Sars and Eaucourt. The 6th Bavarian Reserve Division opposite, occupied Flers Trench , the farmstead of Eaucourt with Bavarian Infantry Regiment 21 and Gird Trench, which ran behind the Butte de Warlencourt. The division was under constant British artillery-fire, which caused many casualties.

Prelude

British offensive preparations

The new men had little time for training with their units and the lack of experienced officers placed greater responsibility on those that remained. On 28 September, Major-General Sir Charles Barter was sacked and replaced by Major-General Sir George Gorringe. The 141st Brigade returned to the line to take over the line from the 1st Division by dawn on 29 September. A further advance was intended, in which the 47th (1/2nd London) Division objective was Eaucourt l'Abbaye, a farmstead on the site of an Augustinian abbey. The area was reputed to have extensive cellars at a low point, where a short valley running from High Wood turns at a right angle, north-westwards to the Albert–Bapaume road. Eaucourt is commanded by higher ground on every side except to the north-west. Before the attack it was desirable to push forward along the Flers Line, to the high ground south-east of the village and the 18th Battalion attacked the feature on 29 September; the attack failed but on 30 September, a second attack gained the objective.

British plan of attack
After the success of the Battle of Morval  and the Battle of Thiepval Ridge  the Fourth Army was instructed on 29 September, to plan the capture of the area around Le Transloy, Beaulencourt and a ridge beyond the valley containing Thilloy and Warlencourt. The attack was to be ready by 12 October and be made in conjunction with attacks by the Reserve Army and the Third Army further north. Before the big offensive, the Fourth Army was to continue its attack to the north-east, to capture a spur short of Le Transloy and Beaulencourt and to the north to reach the near side of the Thilloy–Warlencourt valley. The Fourth Army had already ordered an advance on the left flank on 1 October, to capture Eaucourt and the Flers Line  up to Le Sars. In the 47th (1/2nd London) Division area, the 141st Brigade was to attack with three battalions and two tanks, which were to assemble at the Starfish and drive  to the right flank of the brigade, attacking up the Flers trenches to Eaucourt.

German defensive preparations
In early September, Rupprecht found that frequent relief of troops opposite the British was essential and the other armies on the Western Front were stripped of fresh divisions and units. After the sacking of Erich von Falkenhayn, the German Chief of the General Staff on 29 August, his successors General Paul von Hindenburg and General Erich Ludendorff visited the Western Front and ordered an end to offensive operations at the Battle of Verdun and the reinforcement of the Somme front. Tactics were reviewed and a more "elastic" defence was advocated, to replace the defence of tactically unimportant ground and the routine counter-attacking of Allied advances. After the Battle of Morval, all of the divisions from Combles to Thiepval had to be relieved again and the defences around Eaucourt were taken over by the 6th Bavarian Reserve Division. Destremont Farm, to the south-west of Le Sars, on the north side of the Albert–Bapaume road and a derelict quarry south of Eaucourt had been fortified by the Germans; to the east a sunken lane running north from High Wood crossed the German third line. The junction had been fortified and joined Drop Trench and Goose Alley, forming a quadrilateral. To the north-east, more defensive works were known as Factory Corner. In late September, a brigade of the 6th Bavarian Reserve Division occupied the defences around Eaucourt.

Battle

1 October
A 34 Squadron RFC observer over Eaucourt who watched the attack, reported that

and that the German artillery reply was much smaller and was scattered  around the jumping-off points. Chamier wrote that the British barrage was of an extraordinary volume, moved in a straight line and made the attack easy where the infantry were able to keep up with it. The 1/19th London Regiment managed to advance within  of the German front line and was then driven under cover in shell-holes by German machine-gun fire. The infantry waited for the two tanks, which had to drive some distance and did not reach the 1/19th London until an hour after zero. The tanks drove along either side of the Flers trenches from right to left, firing at the German infantry and silenced machine-guns firing from the west side of the Abbey enclosure, enabling the infantry to resume their advance. The rear waves of the battalion dug in along Flers Support and the forward waves, despite many casualties, pressed on through Eaucourt and met New Zealand troops on the Le Barque road.

The 1/20th London had Eaucourt as its objective and crossed the Flers trenches after the tanks had driven by, then rushed through the farmstead and established a line to the north with the 1/19th London. The position was held under difficult conditions until a line was consolidated round Eaucourt. Both tanks ditched in the Flers trenches west the farm and on the left flank, the 1/17th London encountered uncut wire in front of the Flers Line; some troops got through the wire despite several unsuppressed machine-guns but not in strong enough force to hold the line. Troops of II Battalion, Bavarian Infantry Regiment 17, counter-attacked south-eastwards along the Flers trenches and bombed the British out, as the tanks were set on fire and the crews withdrawn. The new position was vulnerable because of the open left flank, which left a gap to the right of the 50th (Northumberland) Division in the Flers trenches.

2–3 October
The 1/23rd London, which had been attached from the 142nd Brigade, was ordered to attack the Flers Line and to push on through Eaucourt, to link with the 1/19th and 1/20th London, when news of the repulse of the 1/17th London reached the 47th divisional headquarters, in the early hours of 2 October. At noon on, two companies of the 1/18th London, which had taken over from the 1/17 London, reported that the Flers trenches were almost empty of Germans and at  attacked up the Flers Line against little opposition, reached the area to the north-west of Eaucourt and made contact with the 1/20th London, which completed the circuit troops round the village. Touch was also established with the 68th Brigade of the 23rd Division, which had taken over from the 50th Division. During the night of  Bavarian Reserve Infantry Regiment 21 was replaced by Regiment 16 but were not able to hold Eaucourt.

Aftermath

Analysis
It was discovered by the British that on the night of 1 October, the battalion of Bavarian Reserve Infantry Regiment 21, which had faced the 141st Brigade, had been due for relief that night and left before the replacements arrived. The Germans had quickly rushed up a battalion from support; two companies occupied the Flers Line opposite Eaucourt and one company moved east of Eaucourt but small-arms fire from the foremost troops of the 141st Brigade and British artillery-fire forced the Germans under cover. Another company came west of the village through the gap and re-occupied trenches, just in time to meet the attack of the 1/23rd London the next morning. The dark night, pouring rain and the lack of time for reconnaissance of the captured ground had made the positions captured by the British difficult to defend. The success of III Corps in capturing Eaucourt (and Le Sars a few days later) was the last big victory of the Fourth Army in 1916; subsequent attacks on the Butte de Warlencourt were costly failures. The German infantry opposite the Fourth Army had to defend improvised positions, which were destroyed by British heavy artillery-fire, causing many casualties. (The defeats inflicted by the French led to the sacking of the 2nd Army Chief of Staff, Colonel Fritz Bronsart von Schellendorf). The 5th Army at Verdun was ordered to retire from every piece of ground not necessary for the defence of the front, to create reserves for the Somme. The six divisions holding the line from Le Transloy to the Ancre were replaced by seven fresh divisions from the end of September to 13 October, two of which were relieved in turn.

Casualties

Subsequent operations

On 4 October, the 47th (1/2nd London) Division brigades completed the capture of Flers Support unopposed and after nightfall on 5 October, advanced to occupy a ruined mill north-west of Eaucourt. The capture of Eaucourt enabled the British to move several artillery batteries over the High Wood ridge into a valley beyond the Starfish, where they supported attacks on the Butte de Warlencourt. Bavarian Infantry Regiment 16 remained in the line near Eaucourt and suffered many casualties from British artillery-fire and infantry attacks. By 5 October, the commander of I Battalion reported that the battlefield conditions were extraordinary; morale was low because of cold rations and constant artillery-fire, some from German artillery; the number of casualties and the inability to bury dead, which were strewn around the trenches, sapped morale further.

There were no troops to spare to rest the garrison, despite constant appeals from the commanders. Several local counter-attacks were made and on 8 October, a big British attack was repulsed. The defenders managed to repulse the attack and recapture a British foothold in the area of the 7th Company and were then relieved by Reserve Infantry Regiment 181. Bavarian Reserve Infantry Regiment 16 had suffered  in ten days and had only  fit to fight. During the winter lull of 1916–1917, sniping, trench raiding and artillery exchanges continued until the German retreat to the Hindenburg Line in March 1917.

1918
Eaucourt was lost on 24 March 1918, during the retreat of the 2nd Division in Operation Michael, the German spring offensive. The area was recaptured for the last time on 26 August, by the 21st Division, during the Second Battle of Bapaume.

Notes

Footnotes

References

Further reading

 
 
 
 
 
 
 
 
 
 

Theses

External links

 Trench map of the Eaucourt l'Abbaye area
 Winter on the Somme: Australian Official History

Conflicts in 1916
1916 in France
Battle of the Somme
Battles of the Western Front (World War I)
Battles of World War I involving France
Battles of World War I involving Germany
Battles of World War I involving the United Kingdom
October 1916 events